The frosted sac-winged bat (Saccopteryx canescens) is a bat species of the family Emballonuridae found in northern Brazil, Colombia, Ecuador, French Guiana, Guyana, Peru, Suriname, Venezuela and possibly Bolivia.

References

Saccopteryx
Bats of South America
Bats of Brazil
Mammals of Colombia
Mammals of Ecuador
Mammals of French Guiana
Mammals of Guyana
Mammals of Peru
Mammals of Suriname
Mammals of Venezuela
Fauna of the Amazon
Mammals described in 1901
Taxa named by Oldfield Thomas